Vladislav Valeryevich Drogunov (born 3 February 1996) is a Russian football player. He plays for FC Dynamo Bryansk.

Club career
He made his professional debut in the Russian Professional Football League for FC Pskov-747 Pskov on 22 April 2014 in a game against FC Sever Murmansk.

He made his Russian Football National League debut for FC Baltika Kaliningrad on 18 April 2019 in a game against FC Sibir Novosibirsk.

References

External links
 Career summary by sportbox.ru

1996 births
Sportspeople from Pskov
Living people
Russian footballers
Russian expatriate footballers
Expatriate footballers in Portugal
C.D. Aves players
F.C. Tirsense players
FC Baltika Kaliningrad players
FC Dynamo Bryansk players
Association football midfielders
Association football forwards